Wayne W. Ford (born December 21, 1951) is the Iowa State Representative from the 65th District. He has served in the Iowa House of Representatives since 1997.

Early life and education
Ford was born in Washington, D.C. in 1951 and grew up living in Washington's inner city. He graduated from Ballou High School. After high school, he received a football scholarship to play at Rochester Junior College in Minnesota. In 1974, he obtained his bachelor's degree in Education from Drake University where he played on a football scholarship.

Career
Ford currently serves on several committees in the Iowa House - the Appropriations committee; the Economic Growth committee; the Human Resources committee; and the Government Oversight committee, where he is vice chair.

Ford was re-elected in 2006 with 5,405 votes, running unopposed. 
Ford also owns and operates his own consulting firm, Wayne Ford & Associates.

Organizations
Founder of Brown & Black Presidential Forum- 1984
Founder of Urban Dreams- 1985

References

External links
Representative Wayne Ford official Iowa General Assembly site
Representative Wayne W. Ford official constituency site
 
 

|-

1951 births
African-American state legislators in Iowa
Drake Bulldogs football players
Drake University alumni
Living people
Democratic Party members of the Iowa House of Representatives
People from Washington, D.C.
Politicians from Des Moines, Iowa
Rochester Yellowjackets (NJCAA) football players
21st-century African-American people
20th-century African-American people